Killing a Deer or A Deer Hunt – The Kill, is a very large picture (355 by 505 cm), representing a hunting scene, painted in 1867 by Gustave Courbet. The picture is currently on display in the Musée des Beaux-Arts et d'Archéologie of Besançon.

History
The painting was done during the winter of 1866–1867. It is in the large format newly adopted by Courbet, as also in A Burial at Ornans and The Artist's Studio. The work was exhibited at the French art salons and academies of 1869. The picture caused some scandal, major formats being previously reserved for noble history paintings rather than hunting scenes.

Iconography
The scene shows a deer attacked by a pack of hunting dogs and collapsed on the snowy ground. Two characters are on the right. The drill is Cusenier Jules, a resident of Ornans while the man on horseback is Felix Gaudy, of Vuillafans. L'Hallali is in the tradition of representation of the scene hunt, from the seventeenth century. Courbet uses a harsh realistic representation closer to Flemish models. Hunting scenes are common in the paintings of Courbet; every step of the chase is represented

Influences

There is another influence in this painting, that of The Massacre at Chios (1824) by Eugène Delacroix (illustrated). His influence is reflected particularly through the mounted character.

References

Paintings by Gustave Courbet
1867 paintings
kill of deer
Deer in art
Dogs in art
Horses in art
Hunting in art
Paintings about death